Darko Ćulum (born 11 January 1969) is a Bosnian police officer, from July 2020 director of Bosnia and Herzegovina's State Investigation and Protection Agency

Biography 
Ćulum was born in Ljubačevo, 8 km south of Banja Luka. He graduated from the secondary police school in Sarajevo in 1988, when he became a police officer. On 1998 he finished his education at the Faculty of Philosophy in Banja Luka and in 2009 he graduated from Faculty of Security, also in Banja Luka.

From April 1999 Ćulum served as chief of the police group for the prevention of serious thefts. In October 2003  he became chief of the department for the fight against serious crimes. Between 2006 and 2010 he was chief of the sector of crime police of the center for public security of Banja Luka, and between 2010 and 2012 he was chief of the center of public security. In February 2012 he became chief of administration of the RS Police and in February 2015 he was appointed deputy director of the RS police, replacing Nijaz Smajlović.

On 18 August 2016 the Government of Republika Srpska appointed Ćulum as RS police director, replacing Gojko Vasić.
During his term, together with the RS Minister of the Interior Dragan Lukač, Ćulum has been accused of taking part in the cover-up of police officers involved in the death of David Dragičević. Together with Dragan Lukač and Darko Ilić, in 2018 he sued Davor Dragičević, David's father, for libel.

On 14 July 2020 Ćulum was appointed as Director of Bosnia and Herzegovina's State Investigation and Protection Agency.

See also 
 Police of Republika Srpska
 Dragan Lukač

References 

Police of Republika Srpska
1969 births
Living people
People from Banja Luka Region